Novy Biryuzyak is a rural locality (a selo) in Kizlyarsky District, Republic of Dagestan, Russia. The population was 909 as of 2010. There are 8 streets.

Geography 
Novy Biryuzyak is located 97 km southeast of Kizlyar (the district's administrative centre) by road, on the Kordonka River. Staro-Terechnoye and Kollektivizator are the nearest rural localities.

Nationalities 
Avars, Russians and Laks live there.

References 

Rural localities in Kizlyarsky District